Dzmitry Yuryevich Kavalyonak (born 3 November 1977) is a Belarusian former professional footballer.

Career
Born in Minsk, Kavalyonak began playing football with FC Smena Minsk before joining the reserves of Swiss side FC Servette at age 18. He has spent most of his career in the Belarusian Premier League with FC Neman Grodno.

References

External links

1977 births
Living people
Belarusian footballers
Association football forwards
Belarusian expatriate footballers
Expatriate footballers in Switzerland
FC Smena Minsk players
FC Dinamo-Juni Minsk players
FC Dinamo Minsk players
FC Neman Grodno players
FC Naftan Novopolotsk players
FC Darida Minsk Raion players
FC Granit Mikashevichi players
FC Lida players